The Muzzle is a 1958 West German comedy film directed by Wolfgang Staudte and starring O.E. Hasse, Hertha Feiler and Hansjörg Felmy. It is a remake of the 1938 film of the same title.

The film's sets were designed by the art directors Johannes Ott and Rolf Zehetbauer. It was shot at the Wandsbek Studios in Hamburg.

Plot

Cast
 O.E. Hasse as Prosecutor Herbert von Treskow
 Hertha Feiler as Elisabeth von Treskow
 Hansjörg Felmy as Maler Georg Rabanus
 Corny Collins as Trude von Treskow
 Robert Meyn as Senior Prosecutor
 Edith Hancke as Billa
 Rudolf Platte as Kriminalkommissar Mühsam
 Ralf Wolter as Thürnagel
 Lotte Rausch as Frau Tigges
 Ernst Waldow as Gerichtsvorsitzender
 Erni Mangold as Gutsituierte Dame
 Franz-Otto Krüger as Schibulski
 Hans Richter as Maler Ali
 Wolfgang Neuss as Wilhelm Donnerstag
  as Karl Schmidt
 Josef Albrecht as Kriegsminister
 Josef Dahmen as Bankier
 Walter Halden as Justizrat
 Kurt A. Jung as Redakteur Nelles
 Bruno Klockmann as Oberlehrer
 Kurt Klopsch as Kultusminister
 Ludwig Linkmann as Kanzler
 Ruth Lommel
 Karl-Heinz Peters as Innenminister
 Thomas Reiner as Stammgast bei Frau Tigges
 Vera Tschechowa
 Henry Vahl
 Ingrid van Bergen as Modell Mariechen
 Carl Voscherau as Arbeiter

References

Bibliography 
 Williams, Alan. Film and Nationalism. Rutgers University Press, 2002.

External links 
 

1958 films
1950s historical comedy films
German historical comedy films
West German films
1950s German-language films
Films directed by Wolfgang Staudte
Films based on works by Heinrich Spoerl
Films set in the 1890s
Remakes of German films
Films shot at Wandsbek Studios
1958 comedy films
1950s German films